Chapter 3 is the third studio album by South Korean pop music group g.o.d. Released on November 3, 2000, it was the first of their million-selling albums and features "Lies" (거짓말) as its title track. A commercial success, the album sold 1,505,162 copies by the end of the year, making it the second best-selling album of 2000 in South Korea. By April 2001, it sold over 1,824,000 copies.

Background and release 
The album features several of g.o.d's most well-known and popular songs, such as "Lies", "One Candle" and "Sky Blue Balloon", which was dedicated to their fans and referred to their fandom color sky blue.

Critical reception
In its review of the album The Hankyoreh noted that although the overall musical style did not stray from that of the first two albums, the album's appeal lay in the relatable lyrics of the songs, listenable melodies and the members' own natural vocal styles. It also commented that the group's appearance in their reality show g.o.d's Baby Diaries led to the surge in popularity.

Commercial performance 
The album sold 600,000 copies within several days and would go on to sell over 1.8 million copies, making them the first group since Seo Taiji & Boys to surpass the 1.5 million mark. "Lies" ranked number one on multiple music program chart rankings, including Inkigayo, Music Bank, and Music Camp (former version of Show! Music Core) for three consecutive weeks, earning nine music show wins in total. "I Need You" also won four music show wins.

Track listing
All lyrics and music is written and composed by Park Jin-young, except where noted.

Charts and sales

Monthly charts

Year-end charts

Sales

See also
 List of best-selling albums in South Korea

References

External links
Album Information – Mnet 
Chapter 3 on iTunes

G.o.d albums
2000 albums
Korean-language albums